BarBurrito Canada is a quick-serve Mexican chain that focuses on burritos. Founded in 2009 by Alex Shtein, it has grown from its original Toronto location to more than 200 franchises located in Ontario, Alberta, Saskatchewan, Manitoba, Quebec, British Columbia, Nova Scotia, and New Brunswick. The affiliated American restaurant, Burritobar, is located in Howell, Michigan with plans to expand to more locations.

The menu offers fare like burritos, Burrito Bowls, tacos, quesadillas, chips, fries, guacamole, and churros.

References

External links 
 

Fast-food chains of Canada
Fast-food Mexican restaurants